is a town located in Onga District, Fukuoka Prefecture, Japan.

As of 2016, the town has an estimated population of 18,762 and a density of 850 persons per km2. The total area is 22.15 km2.

The Onga river runs between Onga and Mizumaki, located on the other side of the river.

References

External links

Onga official website 

Towns in Fukuoka Prefecture